Stopover is an unincorporated community in Pike County, Kentucky, United States that was established on August 14, 1949. Stopover had a post office with ZIP code 41568.

The town's name came from its first postmaster who also owned the local general store. He would often tell people to "stop over and see" him.

The town is home to a small country store and four churches: Shepard Memorial Presbyterian Church, Stopover Church of God, Stopover Freewill Baptist Church, and Camp Creek Pentecostal Church.

Notable person

Don Blankenship, former CEO of Massey Energy, was born in Stopover.

References

Unincorporated communities in Pike County, Kentucky
Unincorporated communities in Kentucky